Lobelia chinensis, commonly known as Asian lobelia, Chinese lobelia, and Herba Lobellae Chinensis, is a species of flowering plant in the family Campanulaceae. It is one of the 50 fundamental herbs used in traditional Chinese medicine, where it has the name.

Description
It has a long, thin, branching stem that is olive green and green-brown crumpled narrow leaves. It has little to no odor and a sweet and pungent taste. When harvesting herbs for medical use, the ones with the greenest stems and yellower roots are preferred.

Distribution
It is endemic to east, south, southwest, and south-central China.

Herbal medicine
Lobelia chinensis is considered one of the 50 fundamental herbs in Chinese herbology. Historically, L. chinensis has been used in herbal medicine to help stop smoking, however the Food and Drug Administration has banned the use of herbs containing lobeline due to its ineffectiveness.

Chemical constituents
Lobelia chinensis contains 6,7-dimethoxycoumarin, fraxinol, 5-hydroxy-7-methoxycoumarin, tomentin, 3'-hydroxygenkwanin, apigenin, quercetin, luteolin, linarin, luteolin 3',4'-dimethylether-7-O-beta-D-glucoside, isoferulic acid, and ethyl rosmarinate.

Toxicity and adverse effects
Lobelia chinensis is considered mildly toxic due to its adverse effects, including vomiting, heartburn, anxiety, vibrating, eclampsia, increased heart-rate, and severe stomach aches.

References

chinensis
Plants used in traditional Chinese medicine
Endemic flora of China